Damian Skołorzyński (born 12 February 1991 in Węgorzewo) is a Polish footballer who plays as a defender for Winsford United.

Career

Club
He made his debut for Wisła Kraków in Ekstraklasa on 25 May 2011 in a match against Zagłębie Lubin.

He later moved to the United Kingdom where he played for a number of clubs including Mossley.

Honours

Wisła Kraków 
 Ekstraklasa: 2010–11

References

External links
 

Polish footballers
Wisła Kraków players
Bruk-Bet Termalica Nieciecza players
1991 births
Living people
People from Węgorzewo
Sportspeople from Warmian-Masurian Voivodeship
Association football defenders
Mossley A.F.C. players
Ashton United F.C. players
Winsford United F.C. players
Swaffham Town F.C. players